Ireland participated in the Eurovision Song Contest 2012 with the song "Waterline" written by Nick Jarl and Sharon Vaughn. The song was performed by the duo Jedward, who had previously represented Ireland at the Eurovision Song Contest in 2011 where they achieved eighth place with the song "Lipstick". The Irish broadcaster Raidió Teilifís Éireann (RTÉ) organised the national final Eurosong 2012 in order to select the Irish entry for the 2012 contest in Baku, Azerbaijan. Five songs faced the votes of five regional juries and a public televote, ultimately resulting in the selection of "Waterline" performed by Jedward as the Irish Eurovision entry.

Ireland was drawn to compete in the first semi-final of the Eurovision Song Contest which took place on 22 May 2012. Performing as the closing entry during the show in position 18, "Waterline" was announced among the top 10 entries of the first semi-final and therefore qualified to compete in the final on 26 May. It was later revealed that Ireland placed sixth out of the 18 participating countries in the semi-final with 92 points. In the final, Ireland performed in position 23 and placed nineteenth out of the 26 participating countries, scoring 46 points.

Background 

Prior to the 2012 contest, Ireland had participated in the Eurovision Song Contest forty-five times since its first entry in 1965. Ireland has won the contest a record seven times in total. The country's first win came in 1970, with then-18-year-old Dana winning with "All Kinds of Everything". Ireland holds the record for being the only country to win the contest three times in a row (in 1992, 1993 and 1994), as well as having the only three-time winner (Johnny Logan, who won in 1980 as a singer, 1987 as a singer-songwriter, and again in 1992 as a songwriter). The Irish entry in 2011, "Lipstick" performed by Jedward, managed to qualify to the final and placed eighth, achieving Ireland's highest position in the contest since 2000.

The Irish national broadcaster, Raidió Teilifís Éireann (RTÉ), broadcasts the event within Ireland and organises the selection process for the nation's entry. RTÉ confirmed their intentions to participate at the 2012 Eurovision Song Contest on 2 November 2012. From 2008 to 2011, RTÉ had set up the national final Eurosong to choose both the song and performer to compete at Eurovision for Ireland, with both the public and regional jury groups involved in the selection. For the 2012 Eurovision Song Contest, RTÉ announced alongside their confirmation on 2 November 2012 the organisation of Eurosong 2012 to choose the artist and song to represent Ireland at the contest with the continuation of the mentor system that involved five music professionals each selecting one entry for the competition.

Before Eurovision

Early rumours 
In October 2012, it was reported that the Irish national broadcaster, Raidió Teilifís Éireann (RTÉ), had internally selected Jedward to represent the country for the second year in a row, after their successful placing in the Eurovision Song Contest 2011 and the successful ratings of the contest on RTÉ, having drawn the biggest contest audience since . Jedward themselves revealed they will "be doing Eurovision [Song Contest in] 2012" and that it's "its gonna be even bigger and better because [we're] in all these teen magazines, and we go all over Europe". Louis Walsh, the manager of Jedward, expressed his wish for the duo to compete in 2012 almost immediately after they returned to Dublin following Eurovision 2011. The Irish Daily Mail claimed Walsh had already approached Lars Jensen, Martin Larsson and Dan Priddy, the songwriters of the 2011 Irish entry “Lipstick”, to create another entry for the contest.

Eurosong 2012 
In November 2012, the Irish broadcaster revealed Eurosong 2012 will be the national final format used to select Ireland's entry for the Eurovision Song Contest 2012. The competition was held on 24 February 2012 and broadcast on RTÉ One as well as online via the broadcaster's official website rte.ie and at the official Eurovision Song Contest website eurovision.tv during a special edition of The Late Late Show.

Competing entries 
On 3 November 2011, RTÉ revealed the five mentors responsible for selecting the five finalists for the competition. The five finalists were announced on 8 February 2012 and the songs to be performed by the finalists were presented on 9 February 2012 during Mooney broadcast on RTÉ Radio 1. For the second time in a row, 5 Irish music industry professionals were appointed to mentor each of the contestants.

Final 
The final was held on 24 February 2012 and hosted by Ryan Tubridy. The national final featured commentary from a panel that consisted of singer and former contest winner Niamh Kavanagh and Eurovision commentator Marty Whelan. Guest performer was Brotherhood of Man performing "Save Your Kisses for Me". Following the 50/50 combination of votes from five regional juries and public televoting, "Waterline" performed by Jedward was selected as the winner.

At Eurovision
According to Eurovision rules, all nations with the exceptions of the host country and the "Big Five" (France, Germany, Italy, Spain and the United Kingdom) are required to qualify from one of two semi-finals in order to compete for the final; the top ten countries from each semi-final progress to the final. The European Broadcasting Union (EBU) split up the competing countries into six different pots based on voting patterns from previous contests, with countries with favourable voting histories put into the same pot. On 25 January 2012, a special allocation draw was held which placed each country into one of the two semi-finals, as well as which half of the show they would perform in. Ireland was placed into the first semi-final, to be held on 22 May 2012, and was scheduled to perform in the second half of the show. The running order for the semi-finals was decided through another draw on 20 March 2012 and as one of the five wildcard countries, Ireland chose to perform last in position 18, following the entry from Moldova.

In Ireland, the semi-finals were broadcast on RTÉ2 and the final was broadcast on RTÉ One with commentary by Marty Whelan. The second semi-final and final were also broadcast via radio on RTÉ Radio 1 with commentary by Shay Byrne and Zbyszek Zalinski. The Irish spokesperson, who announced the Irish votes during the final, was Gráinne Seoige.

Semi-final 
Jedward took part in technical rehearsals on 14 and 17 May, followed by dress rehearsals on 21 and 22 May. This included the jury final on 21 May where professional juries of each country, responsible for 50 percent of each country's vote, watched and voted on the competing entries.

The Irish performance featured Jedward performing on central raised dais and dressed in waterproof gold robot costumes, surrounded by four backing vocalists: Claire O'Malley, Jules Edwards, Leanne Moore and Shane Creevey. Moore had previously been a backing vocalist for Jedward in 2011. As the middle of the dais was stepped on during the performance, a water fountain came on which encircled the duo and soaked them. The performance also featured pyrotechnic effects.

At the end of the show, Ireland was announced as having finished in the top 10 and consequently qualifying for the grand final. It was later revealed that Ireland placed sixth in the semi-final, receiving a total of 92 points.

Final 
Shortly after the first semi-final, a winners' press conference was held for the ten qualifying countries. As part of this press conference, the qualifying artists took part in a draw to determine the running order for the final and Ireland was drawn to perform in position 23, following the entry from Macedonia and before the entry from Serbia.

Jedward once again took part in dress rehearsals on 25 and 26 May before the final, including the jury final where the professional juries cast their final votes before the live show. Jedward performed a repeat of his semi-final performance during the final on 26 May. Ireland placed nineteenth in the final, scoring 46 points.

Voting 
Voting during the three shows consisted of 50 percent public televoting and 50 percent from a jury deliberation. The jury consisted of five music industry professionals who were citizens of the country they represent, with their names published before the contest to ensure transparency. This jury was asked to judge each contestant based on: vocal capacity; the stage performance; the song's composition and originality; and the overall impression by the act. In addition, no member of a national jury could be related in any way to any of the competing acts in such a way that they cannot vote impartially and independently. The individual rankings of each jury member were released shortly after the grand final.

Following the release of the full split voting by the EBU after the conclusion of the competition, it was revealed that Ireland had placed fourth with the public televote and tenth with the jury vote in the first semi-final. In the public vote, Ireland scored 116 points, while with the jury vote, Ireland scored 72 points. In the final, Ireland had placed tenth with the public televote and twenty-fifth with the jury vote. In the public vote, Ireland scored 89 points, while with the jury vote, Ireland scored 14 points.

Below is a breakdown of points awarded to Ireland and awarded by Ireland in the first semi-final and grand final of the contest, and the breakdown of the jury voting and televoting conducted during the two shows:

Points awarded to Ireland

Points awarded by Ireland

References

2012
Countries in the Eurovision Song Contest 2012
Eurovision
Eurovision
Eurovision